Apalachicola Regional Airport  is a county-owned, public-use airport located two nautical miles (4 km) west of the central business district of Apalachicola, a city in Franklin County, Florida, United States. It is included in the National Plan of Integrated Airport Systems for 2011–2015, which categorized it as a general aviation facility. It was previously known as Apalachicola Municipal Airport. The airport supports general aviation activity in the area and provides service via a tenant fixed-base operator (FBO).

History
The current airport was originally constructed in 1939 by the U.S. Army Air Corps. Expanded in February 1942, Apalachicola Army Airfield became a sub base of Tyndall Field, the present day Tyndall Air Force Base.  Apalachicola AAF's mission was to support the operations of the Training Command Flexible Gunnery School under the 2136th Army Air Forces Base Unit, and as a sub-base and auxiliary airfield for Tyndall.  The Army Airfield was inactivated at the end of World War II on September 30, 1945, and turned over to Army Corps of Engineers on February 2, 1947, as excess.  Eventually discharged to the War Assets Administration (WAA), it was deeded to municipality of Apalachicola and became a civil airport.

On March 15, 1964, a pilot with the U.S. Navy's Flight Demonstration Squadron, the Blue Angels, was killed during an attempted emergency landing at Apalachicola Municipal Airport when his F-11A Tiger experienced engine difficulties while transiting from West Palm Beach, Florida, back to the Blue Angels' home base at NAS Pensacola, Florida. LT George L. Neale, USN, age 29, who flew in the Number Four slot position of the diamond formation, was returning from a demonstration at West Palm Beach with one other of the six team jets and an R5D Skymaster support plane when he radioed Tyndall Air Force Base, near Panama City, Florida, that he was declaring an emergency and requesting permission to land at Tyndall AFB when he suffered engine mechanical problems south of Apalachicola.  Spotting the Apalachicola Airport, he attempted a landing there, ejecting on final approach at 1115 hrs. as the fighter came down ~250 yards short of the runway. Although he cleared the airframe at ~150–200 feet altitude, his chute did not have sufficient time to deploy and he was killed. He was survived by his wife Donna, of Pensacola, Florida, and his mother, Mrs. Katherine Neale, of Avalon, Pennsylvania. Official Navy press reports at the time said that the cause of the mishap was being investigated.

Facilities and aircraft 
Apalachicola Regional Airport covers an area of 1,100 acres (445 ha) at an elevation of 20 feet (6 m) above mean sea level. It has three runways (06/24, 13/31, 18/36) each of which has a concrete surface measuring 5,271 by 150 feet (1,607 x 46 m): .

For the 12-month period ending August 25, 2009, the airport had 24,375 aircraft operations, an average of 66 per day: 94% general aviation, 5% air taxi, and 1% military. At that time there were 24 aircraft based at this airport: 92% single-engine and 8% multi-engine.

See also

 Florida World War II Army Airfields
 75th Flying Training Wing (World War II)

References

External links
  brochure from CFASPP
 Aerial image as of January 1999 from USGS The National Map
 

Airports in Florida
Transportation buildings and structures in Franklin County, Florida
1939 establishments in Florida
Airfields of the United States Army Air Forces in Florida
Military installations closed in 1947
Apalachicola, Florida